Lutz Mommartz (born 6 March 1934 in Erkelenz) is a German film director (collaborator, director, script, camera, editing, music, producer, production management, recording management).

Biography
Lutz Mommartz moved with his parents to Düsseldorf in 1937. From 1952 to 1975 he worked at local government administration of Düsseldorf as an inspector. Since 1967, when he gave up painting, Lutz Mommartz began shooting 16mm films. In the same year, he won a world-famous filmpreis with his film "Selbstschüsse" at the international experimental film festival in Knokke-le-Zoute, Belgium.  On 1 October 1975 he founded a film class at the Kunstakademie Düsseldorf, Department of Kunsterzieher Münster. In 1977, he received the Federal Film Prize in silver for Beckett and 1978 the same for The Garden of Eden. In 1978 he received the professorship for film at the Künstakademie Münster.  He is currently working on securing and distributing his archive.

Lutz Mommartz lives and works today in Düsseldorf, from 2001 to 2011 also in Berlin.

Filmography
 1965: Egon Wolke (Produzent: Gustav Ehmck)
 1967: Eisenbahn
 1967: Selbstschüsse
 1967: Die Treppe
 1967: Markeneier
 1967: Tanzschleife
 1967: Oben / Unten
 1967: Der Finger
 1968: Gegenüber ZWEILEINWANDKINO
 1968: Rechts/Links ZWEILEINWANDKINO
 1968: 3Gläser
 1968: Immatrikulation
 1968: Weg zum Nachbarn
 1969: Überfordert
 1969: 400 m IFF
 1969: Soziale Plastik (mit Joseph Beuys)
 1970: Mietersolidarität
 1970: Wählt ADF
 1970: Altersporno
 1970: Spanienkrimi
 1971: Inspektion
 1971: Das aggressive braune Wasser in den Leitungen des Herrn Professors
 1971: Farbstreifen
 1972: Denkmäler (mit Jürgen Kuhfuß)
 1974: Die Angst am Rhein
 1974: Haircut
 1975: Farbstreifen
 1975: Der gerechte Krieg 1525 (mit Hartmut Kaminski und der Filmgruppe Düsseldorf)
 1975: Als wär's von Beckett
 1976: Die Schiller
 1976: Flügelschlagen
 1977: Der Garten Eden
 1978: Mehr als Zwei
 1979: Schattenkur
 1980: Tango durch Deutschland
 1982: Dreharbeit
 1983: Jeder Mensch ist ein Tisch, nur, ich bin ein Stuhl
 1983: Transit nach Berlin (mit Mama Woju)
 1985: Marmor bleibt immer kühl
 1985: Anziehen
 1986: Die italienische Jagd
 1986: Die letzte Zigarette
 1987: Focus
 1987: Langsamer Walzer
 1988: aurich
 1988: Vier kleine Stücke
 1989: Angst unter den Sternen
 1990: Eddie

Videos 
 1992: Fensterbild
 1992: Die Tänzerin
 1993: Schattenwand
 1996: Bergbach bei Schrunz – Painting
 1996: Fenster zum Hof
 1997: Tausend Scherben – Die große Baustelle
 1997: Digitale Kompression
 1997: El periodo especial
 1997: Buckow
 1997: Der Mann, der Hitler verbrannte
 1998: Jugendweihe 98
 1998: Cafe Buckow
 2003: Sonata Volumen (Ohne Titel)
 2007: Margrets Film
 2010: Schwarz/Weiss
 2010: Barcelona 1999, Zehn Jahre danach (Alias: I am Rembrand)
 2011: Kleine Stücke
 2011: NICHTS
 2013: Mafia XU
 2017: DEPTHINESS – Hans Rombach buchstabiert
 Arbeitet am Projekt Instanz Änderung des Grundgesetzes

Bibliografie 
 1979: "Frei – wozu"  (free – for what) Speech addressed to the students on the occasion of their matriculation on 17 October 1979. Edition of the department art educators Münster of the Academy of Fine Arts Düsseldorf.
 2000: "Das Authentische als Kunst" 3 Volumes, Hardcover, 13 x 18 cm with 3146 film stills (1846 in color). The Authentic as Art.Band 1–3  Reviews and short own texts between the image sequences. A comprehensive look at his work from 1964 to 1999 consisting of early recordings of friends with the 8mm camera, his successes in the Artists' Film and Underground Cinema, his documentary work to study human limits – People in experimental situations and his work with students at the Art Academy Münster Germany. THE BOOK AS AN ART OBJECT can be ordered with the author himself or at the bookstore Walther König / Cologne / Germany.
 2004: "text 2002/3" Hardcover,  The newspaper reading in the internet still was for free. I moved with 68 years to Berlin to witness the descent of the city after the reunification before it might eventually rises up again.  While reading the SPIEGEL in the internet I came across one onlinepartnership agency, that started to establish them at that time in the internet. Quite unintentionally an exchange developed with multiple mail partners. I fell in love a few times. Two relations went beyond. And here with the background of a forty year old community with my partner in Düsseldorf a new love story evolved. The idea of finding material for a time map, led me to save the correspondence.text 2002/3 is a book that consists of mail and SMS – in their original form without omissions or corrections. It was joined in "Justified" in four seamless columns to a language mesh. So it is to the reader to associate in the sea of words or to embark on the search for the intimate story. The mail data are underlined, the SMS data not.  For the sake of authenticity the text is available in an easily readable form at archive.org. Involved with which the publication has not been discussed, remain anonymous. 
 2006: "text 2003/6" Hardcover,  The continuation of the book text 2002/3 also consists of mails and text messages in the original form without omissions or corrections. However, unlike in this language mesh text 2003/6 hides itself completely in a visual poem. Layout with 18 columns per double page . Courier New font 11.5 flush right, spread with 4.5 pt and compressed with 3 pt line spacing, so that the letters overlap each other in half. However, watching at a screen the letters do overlap only the lower halves. The printing process makes it visible by cutting off the top half of the letters and with the other lower halves a new font is created.  For the sake of authenticity the text is available in an easily readable form at archive.org. Involved with which the publication has not been discussed, remain anonymous. 
 2008: "Margret" Hardcover,  Margret G., born in 1929 in Tecklenburg, was my partner since more than 45 years. With metastases in the abdomen, she fought the last years of her life and spend her last days in a hospice in Düsseldorf Germany.  When I said goodbye to her to go to sleep in the evening of 15 August, I was surprised by her call later that evening. She had taken of her clothes and wanted me to come to take a picture of her: "A picture for the art".  I was irritated when I drove to her and I went without my camera, because she always had refused to be photographed. It was then when I saw her in front of me, that I realized what was going on. The next day I fulfilled her desire – as if it was mine. With taking pictures of her we fulfilled miraculously both our lives.  Margaret's letters from August 1957 to March 1961, her death on 16 /17 August 2006 (taken with a video camera) and extracts from her travel logs and her last notes.

References

External links
Official website: 

Living people
1934 births
Mass media people from Düsseldorf